The Young Marrieds is an American daytime soap opera which aired on ABC from October 5, 1964 to March 25, 1966.

The program was created by James Elward and written by Elward with Frances Rickett. Authors John Pascal and Francine Pascal also wrote for the series. It was produced in Hollywood by Selig Seligman through his production company Selmur Productions. Producers included Richard Dunn and Eugene Barr. The serial was directed by Frank Pacelli.

Mike Lawrence was the series announcer.

Overview
The Young Marrieds focused on the conflicts between three married couples in the suburban community of Queen's Point. Dr. Dan Garrett and his wife Susan Garrett, commercial artist Walter Reynolds and his wife Ann Reynolds, and Matt Stevens and Liz Stevens, a young couple who were engaged and ready to begin their married life together.

Shortly into the soap's brief year-and-a-half run, the Stevenses were wed then written out of the storyline, which was refocused almost solely on the marital problems of the Garretts and the Reynoldses. Susan Garrett struggled with the knowledge that she was the biological mother of 10-year-old Jerry Karr, who had been adopted years before by Lena Gilroy, an actress. Susan wanted to gain custody of the boy, but Lena was unwilling to give him up. Meanwhile, the Garretts' neighbor Walter Reynolds saw his marriage unravel as wife Ann, his former model, embarked upon a career as manager of Halstead's, a successful local department store. Ann and Walter eventually agreed to divorce, but they secretly remained in love with one another, although circumstances continued to keep them apart.

Ratings
The Young Marrieds aired immediately following General Hospital (another soap opera produced by Selmur Productions) at 3:30ET/2:30 CT. Though it rated fairly well for fledgling ABC Daytime, the serial aired directly opposite The Edge of Night, a top-rated soap opera on CBS, and failed to maintain enough of General Hospitals lead-in audience to make it viable. The final telecast on March 25, 1966 ended with a cliffhanger that would remain forever unresolved, as a despondent Walter, having learned he would go blind from a serious illness, locked himself in his studio with a loaded gun, apparently ready to commit suicide.

Main crew
Dick Dunn    
Paul Nickell    
James Elward (Head Writer for the first 10 weeks)
John D. Hess
Frances Rickett

Cast
 Susan Brown as Ann Reynolds #2
 Brenda Benet as Jill McComb #2
 Les Brown Jr. as Buzz Korman
 Norma Connolly as Lena Karr Gilroy
 Floy Dean as Liz Forsythe Stevens
 Charles Grodin as Matt Crane Stevens #2
 Ted Knight as Phil Sterling
 Peggy McCay as Susan Garrett
 Michael Mikler as Walter Reynolds
 Constance Moore as Irene Forsythe #2
 Paul Picerni as Dan Garret
 Pat Rossen as Jerry Karr
 Barry Russo as Roy Gilroy
 Michael Stefani as Paul Stevens
 Susan Seaforth as Carol West
 Irene Hervey as Irene Forsythe #1 
 Donald Randolph as Theo Stevens
 Maria Palmer as Mady Stevens
 Lee Meriwether as Ann Reynolds #1
 Robert Hogan as Gillespie
 Frank Maxwell as Henry Korman
 Maxine Stuart as Mrs. Korman
 Betty Conner as Jill McComb #1
 Ken Metcalf as Jimmy Dahl
 Irene Tedrow as Aunt Alex
 Scott Graham as Matt Crane Stevens #1

References

External links

American television soap operas
American Broadcasting Company original programming
1960s American drama television series
1964 American television series debuts
1966 American television series endings
Black-and-white American television shows
English-language television shows
Television series by Selmur Productions